Burkina Faso competed at the 2016 Summer Paralympics in Rio de Janeiro, Brazil, from 7 September to 18 September 2016.

Delegation 
The country sent a team of 1 athletes, a man, to the 2016 Summer Paralympics.  He competed in athletics.

Disability classifications

Every participant at the Paralympics has their disability grouped into one of five disability categories; amputation, the condition may be congenital or sustained through injury or illness; cerebral palsy; wheelchair athletes, there is often overlap between this and other categories; visual impairment, including blindness; Les autres, any physical disability that does not fall strictly under one of the other categories, for example dwarfism or multiple sclerosis. Each Paralympic sport then has its own classifications, dependent upon the specific physical demands of competition. Events are given a code, made of numbers and letters, describing the type of event and classification of the athletes competing. Some sports, such as athletics, divide athletes by both the category and severity of their disabilities, other sports, for example swimming, group competitors from different categories together, the only separation being based on the severity of the disability.

Athletics 

Jacques Ouedraogo  competed in the Men's 100m - T54 event.  In Round 1 Heat 2, he finished seventh in a time of 19:34.  The French speaking 38-year-old from Ouagadougou is coached by Issouf Darahkoum.  He started participating in athletics in 1996 for fun, and continued in the sport because it provided him with a number of opportunities he would not have had otherwise.  He compete at the African Games in 2003 and 2005, winning silver medals in his event at both Games.  These performances were his best in international competition.  He is a member of the Abushis athletics club.

Men's Track

See also 
Burkina Faso at the 2016 Summer Olympics

References 

Nations at the 2016 Summer Paralympics
2016
Paralympics